Loi Faaeteete (born 1 June 1960) is a Samoan boxer. He competed in the men's heavyweight event at the 1984 Summer Olympics.

References

1960 births
Living people
Samoan male boxers
Olympic boxers of Samoa
Boxers at the 1984 Summer Olympics
Place of birth missing (living people)
Heavyweight boxers